Zee Tamil Kudumbam Viruthugal is an awards ceremony held yearly, sponsored by Zee Tamil. This event is held at the end of each year and awards are given to the best entertainers for variety programs aired on its channel. The first awards ceremony happened in 2018.

Awards

2018
The Zee Tamil Kudumbam Viruthugal 2018 Red Carpet was aired on 21 October 2018. The show was hosted by Deepak Dinkar, Archana Chandhoke and Kamal Dhandapani. The show ceremony took place on 13 October 2018 at Nandanam, Chennai and was telecast during the fourth week of October on Zee Tamil. Guests who attended the function included actor Sathyaraj, director Atlee, actress Jyothika, Amala Paul, Aishwarya Rajesh and actor Vishal.

2019
The second edition of Zee Tamil Kudumbam Viruthugal 2019 was held on 13 October 2019. The show was telecast on 27 October and attended by famous film personalities like Sneha, Aishwarya Rajesh, Vijay Sethupathi, Sivakarthikeyan, R. Parthiban, Oviya, Devayani, Vani Bhojan and Ritika Singh.

2020
The third edition of Zee Tamil Kudumbam Viruthugal 2020 was telecast on Zee Tamil on 25 October to 8 November 2020. Archana Chandhoke and Deepak Dinkar as the hosts. Many Kollywood celebs including Vijay Sethupathi, Aishwarya Rajesh, Harish Kalyan, Vijay Antony and Jiiva will be a part of the show.

2022
The fourth edition of Zee Tamil Kudumbam Viruthugal 2022 will telecast on 14 and 16 January. The show will host by Archana Chandhoke and RJ Vijay.

Nominations

Favorite Heroine

2018
 Ashwini Radhakrishna (Rasathi) – Oru Oorula Oru Rajakumari	
 Nachathira (Vennila) – Yaaradi Nee Mohini	
 Reshma Reya (Shakthi) – Poove Poochoodava	
 Sameera Sherief (Malar) – Rekka Katti Parakuthu Manasu
 Shabana (Parvathi) – Sembaruthi

2019
 Ashwini Radhakrishna (Rasathi) – Oru Oorula Oru Rajakumari
 Ayesha (Sathya) – Sathya
 Nachathira (Vennila) – Yaaradi Nee Mohini
 Rachitha Mahalakshmi (Jothi) – Nachiyarpuram
 Reshma Reya (Shakthi) – Poove Poochoodava
 Shabana (Parvathi) – Sembaruthi
 Shivani Narayanan – (Anu/Abi) – Rettai Roja

2020
 Asha Gowda (Vasundhra) – Gokulathil Seethai
 Ashwini Radhakrishna (Rasathi) – Oru Oorula Oru Rajakumari
 Ayesha (Sathya) – Sathya
 Dharshana Ashokan (Anu) – Needhane Endhan Ponvasantham
 Nachathira (Vennila) – Yaaradi Nee Mohini
 Reshma Reya (Shakthi) – Poove Poochoodava
 Shabana (Parvathi) – Sembaruthi

2022
 Ashika Padukone (Maari) – Maari
 Kanmani Manoharan (Amudha) – Amudhavum Annalakshmiyum
 Shreya Anchan (Rajini) – Rajini
 Swathi Sharma (Bommi) – Ninaithale Inikkum
 Tejashwini Gowda (Vidhya) – Vidhya No.1
 Vaishnavi (Vanathi) – Peranbu

Favorite Hero

2018
 Dinesh Gopalsamy (Shiva) – Poove Poochoodava	
 Karthik Raj (Aadhi) –	Sembaruthi
 Puvi Arasu (Jeeva) – Azhagiya Tamizh Magal
 Shreekumar (Mutharasu) – Yaaradi Nee Mohini	
 Siddarth Kumaran (Tamizh) – Rekka Katti Parakuthu Manasu

2019
 Dinesh Gopalsamy (Karthik) –  Nachiyarpuram	
 Karthik Raj (Aadhi) –	Sembaruthi
 Puvi Arasu (Iniyan) – Oru Oorula Oru Rajakumari
 Shreekumar (Mutharasu) – Yaaradi Nee Mohini
 Vishnu (Prabhu) – Sathya

2020
 Akshay kamal (Sanjeev) – Rettai Roja
 Jai Akash (Suryaprakash) – Needhane Endhan Ponvasantham
 Karthik Raj (Aadhi) –	Sembaruthi
 Nanda Gopal (Arjun) – Gokulathil Seethai
 Puvi Arasu (Iniyan) – Oru Oorula Oru Rajakumari
 Shreekumar (Mutharasu) – Yaaradi Nee Mohini
 Vishnu (Prabhu) – Sathya

2022
 Anand Selvan (Siddarth) – Ninaithale Inikkum
 Arun Crizer (Parthiban) – Rajini
 Pasanga Sivakumar (Markandeyan) – Thavamai Thavamirundhu
 Puvi Arasu (Sanjay) – Vidhya No.1
 Vijay Venkatesan (Karthik) – Peranbu

Favorite Villi

2018
 Chaitra Reddy	(Swetha) – Yaaradi Nee Mohini
 Oorvambu Lakshmi (Vanaja) –	Sembaruthi
 Sadhana (Rajamma) –	Azhagiya Tamil Magal
 Subbulakshmi Rangan (Deepika) –	Azhagiya Tamil Magal
 Yuvarani (Subadhra) – Poove Poochoodava

2019
 Bindu Aneesh (Maragatham) – Oru Oorula Oru Rajakumari
 Chaitra Reddy (Swetha) – Yaaradi Nee Mohini
 Oorvambu Lakshmi (Vanaja) – Sembaruthi
 Meenakumari (Subadhra) – Poove Poochoodava
 Koli Ramya (Divya) – Sathya

2020 
 Chaitra Reddy (Swetha) – Yaaradi Nee Mohini
 Oorvambu Lakshmi (Vanaja) – Sembaruthi
 VJ Mounika (Nandini) – Sembaruthi and (Sreeja) – Rettai Roja
 Meenakumari (Subadhra) – Poove Poochoodava
 Nalini (Gandhimathi) – Gokulathil Seethai
 Royal Swathi (Kanmani) – Oru Oorula Oru Rajakumari

2022
 Oorvambu Lakshmi (Amudha) – Peranbu 
 Sona Heiden (Thara) – Maari
 Subathira (Pushpa) – Meenakshi Ponnunga 
 Subiksha Kayarohanam (Radhika) – Rajini 
 Suveta Shrimpton (Tamannah) – Ninaithale Inikkum
 Yalini Rajan (Uma) – Thavamai Thavamirundhu

Best category Awards for Fiction

Best Serial

Best Serial-Matinee

Best Actor

Best Actress

Best Hero-Matinee

Best Heroine-Matinee

Best Pair

Best Villi

Best Supporting Actor Male

Best Supporting Actor Female

Best Comedian

Best Comedian-Female

Best Child Actors

Best Director

Favorite category Awards for Fiction

Favorite Serial

Favorite Hero
The award was first awarded in 2018 under the title Favorite Hero. An award called Favorite Actor-Male was also awarded occasionally in 2022.

Favorite Heroine
The award was first awarded in 2018 under the title Favorite Heroine. An award called Favorite Actor-Female was also awarded occasionally in 2022.

Favorite Pair On-Screen
The award was first awarded in 2018 under the title Favorite Pair On-Screen. An award called Favorite Pair was also awarded occasionally in 2022.

Favorite Villi

Most Popular Appa

Most Popular Amma

Best Amma

Most Popular Pair

Most Popular Marumagal

Most Popular Maamiyar

Best Maamiyar and Marumgal

Most Promising Actor-Male

Most Promising Actor-Female

Hero of Common Man

Heroin of Common Man

Game Changer Fiction

Find of the year

Awards for Non-Fiction

Best Non Fiction Shows

Non-Fiction Special Award

Best Anchor Male

Best Anchor Female

Best Duo Anchors

Favorite Anchor

Best Entertainer

Most Promising Anchor

Popular Reality Show Face

Game Changer Non Fiction

Best Judges

Special Jury Awards

Zee Tamil all Rounder

Lifetime Achievement

Small Screen to Big Screen

Pioneer of TV

Special Award

Most Popular Movie on Zee Tamil

Rising Star-Female

Rising Star-Male

Contribution to Cinema & Television Special Award

Voice of Zee Tamil

Makkal Nayakan

Namma Veettu Lakshmi

Social Media Face of The Year-Male

Social Media Face of The Year-Female

Peoples`s Choice Awards

Peoples`s Choice-Serial of The Year

Peoples`s Choice-Face of The Year

Best Feel Good Web Series of The Year

Zee5 Awards

Best Web Series of The Year on Zee5

Best Performing show on Zee5

Best Opening show on Zee5

References

External links
  at ZEE5

Tamil-language television awards
Zee Entertainment Enterprises
2018 Tamil-language television series debuts